Watkins Memorial High School is a public high school located in Etna Township, southeast of Pataskala, Ohio, United States. It is the only high school in the Southwest Licking Local School District, which was formed in 1950 by the merger of the Etna Township, Kirkersville, and Pataskala one room K-12 buildings. Athletic teams are known as the Warriors and school colors are black and gold.

The school was named in memory of Dr. Watkins who served the community for years. The school's biggest sports rival is Licking Heights High School. The yearly football game between the Watkins Warriors and the Licking Heights Hornets is referred to as "The Battle for Broad Street". Broad street, or State Route 16, runs through Pataskala and whichever team wins this game has a small dead-end road next to the Town Hall named in their honor, either Warrior Way or Hornet Way, for the year until the next Watkins/Heights game. Watkins Middle School is located next to the high school.

The students that attend Watkins Memorial High School live in the city of Pataskala, and the following three townships: Kirkersville Township, Etna Township, and Harrison Township, all of which are in the second largest county in Ohio's 12th Congressional District, Licking County.

State championships

 Boys Soccer – 2004 
Baseball, (Etna High School Eagles consolidated with Pataskala and Kirkersville to form Watkins Memorial)-1936
Boys rugby 2021 & 2022

References

External links
 

High schools in Licking County, Ohio
Public high schools in Ohio